Blennius normani is a species of combtooth blenny found in the eastern Atlantic ocean. It reaches a maximum length of  SL. The specific name honours the British ichthyologist John Roxborough Norman (1898-1944) of the British Museum (Natural History).

References

normani
Marine fauna of Africa
Fish of Angola
Fish of the East Atlantic
Fish described in 1949